Rigidsociaria is a genus of moths belonging to the family Tortricidae.

Species
Rigidsociaria erinaceola Razowski, 1986

See also
List of Tortricidae genera

References

 , 1986: New and little known Neotropical Cochylidii (Lepidoptera, Tortricidae). Acta Zoologica Cracoviensia 29: 373-396 (377).
 , 2011: Diagnoses and remarks on genera of Tortricidae, 2: Cochylini (Lepidoptera: Tortricidae). SHILAP Revista de Lepidopterología 39 (156): 397–414.

External links
Tortricid.net

Cochylini
Tortricidae genera